Sun Dirt Water is the fifth studio album by iconic Australian folk rock band The Waifs. It was released by Jarrah Records on 1 September 2007. It debuted at number two in the ARIA Albums Chart on 10 September. It was certified platinum, for shipment of 70000 units, in 2010.

Track listing
"Pony" (Cunningham)
"Sun Dirt Water" (Thorn)
"Vermillion" (Simpson)
"How Many Miles" (Cunningham)
"Without You" (Cunningham)
"Sad Sailor Song" (Simpson)
"Get Me Some" (Cunningham)
"Eternity" (Cunningham)
"Sweetest Dream" (Cunningham)
"Goodbye" (Cunningham)
"Stay" (Cunningham)
"Love Let Me Down" (Simpson)
"Feeling Sentimental" (Cunningham)

Personnel

The Waifs
Josh Cunningham - vocals, acoustic & electric guitars, ukulele
Donna Simpson - vocals, acoustic guitar, percussion
Vikki Thorn - vocals, harmonica, acoustic guitar
Ben Franz - electric & double bass
David Ross Macdonald - drums & percussion

Additional Musicians
Reese Wynans - hammond b3, piano, wurlitzer
Dan Dugmore - pedal steel, lap steel
Jeff Coffin - clarinet
Scat Springs - background vocals
Erick Jaskowiak - background vocals
Garry West - hand claps

Credits
Produced by The Waifs and Garry West
Recorded at Compass Sound Studio, Nashville, TN
Engineered by Erick Jaskowiak

Charts

Weekly charts

Year-end charts

Certifications

References

External links
Official site

2007 albums
The Waifs albums